Glauco Masetti (April 19, 1922, Milan - May 27, 2001, Milan) was an Italian jazz reedist.

Masetti was classically trained on violin, attending the Milan and Turin conservatories, and was an autodidact on reed instruments. In the late 1940s, he worked with Gil Cuppini for the first time, an association that would continue into the 1960s. He worked often as a session musician in the first half of the 1950s with Gianni Basso and Oscar Valdambrini among others. He led his own ensemble from 1955, and he played with Eraldo Volonté and Chet Baker. In addition to working with Cuppini for most of the 1960s, he also played with Giorgio Gaslini during that decade.

References
"Glauco Masetti". The New Grove Dictionary of Jazz. 2nd edition, ed. Barry Kernfeld.

1922 births
2001 deaths
Italian jazz saxophonists
Male saxophonists
Italian jazz clarinetists
Italian jazz bandleaders
20th-century saxophonists
20th-century Italian male musicians
Male jazz musicians